Supilinn (Estonian for "Soup Town") is a neighbourhood of Tartu, Estonia. It is located just north of the city centre, on the right bank of Emajõgi River. Supilinn has a population of 1,863 (as of 31 December 2013). With an area of  it is the smallest neighbourhood of Tartu. Supilinn is especially famous for being a former slum, mostly consisting of 1–2 floored wooden apartment buildings.

Gallery

See also
Tartu Song Festival Grounds
A. Le Coq

References

External links
Official website 

Tartu